The  is a preserved railway tunnel located near  on the Chūō Main Line in Kōshū, Yamanashi Prefecture, Japan.

Description 
The Ōhikage Tunnel was constructed from 1896 as part of the overall construction of the Chūō Main Line. It was faced with brick and opened for traffic in 1903.

The gradual increase in railway traffic on the Chūō Main Line starting from 1931 led to the construction of a double track, which was completed in 1968. However, by the 1990s, the Ōhikage Tunnel was considered outdated and the Shin-Ōhikage Tunnel was constructed as its replacement. The Ōhikage Tunnel was closed in 1997.

After 1997, sections of the tunnel were used to store wine from the vineyards around Kōshū. From 2005 to 2007, renovations were undertaken on various sections in and outside the tunnel to turn it into a tourist destination. In March 2007, the tunnel opened to the public. At the same time, the industrial importance of the tunnel was recognized by the Ministry of Economy, Trade and Industry on its “Heritage of Industrial Modernization List. However, due to water leakage, the tunnel was closed for repairs in January 2012.

Details 
 Overall length - 1.367 km
 Width - 3.57m - 3.74m
 Height - 4.90m
 Operating Hours - 09:00 to 15:00 hrs

References 

Railway tunnels in Japan
Tunnels completed in 1903
Buildings and structures in Yamanashi Prefecture
Kōshū, Yamanashi